The Ghana Interbank Payment and Settlement Systems (GhIPSS) is the Government of Ghana agency responsible for the interconnecting banks that operate in Ghana. One of the aims of GhIPSS is to link all automated teller machines and E-zwich point of sales terminal for cross usage.

See also 
e-zwich
gh-link

References 

Banking in Ghana